Thomas Peter Rademacher (November 20, 1928 – June 4, 2020) was an American heavyweight boxer. A gold medalist at the 1956 Olympics, he became the only person to challenge for the world heavyweight championship in his first professional bout when he faced Floyd Patterson in Seattle on August 22, 1957.  He compiled a 15-8-1 record over 23 professional bouts. 

A former college football player at Washington State, Rademacher took up boxing as a form of rehabilitation during his recovery from rheumatic fever, which he contracted in military school.

Amateur career
In his amateur career, Rademacher won 72 bouts and lost 7. He won a series of tournaments, including the 1949 and 1951–1953 Seattle Golden Gloves (he lost in 1950 to Zora Folley, who was his frequent opponent throughout his boxing career), and the US Amateur Championship as a heavyweight in 1953—avenging his earlier loss to Folley. 

He captured the Chicago Golden Gloves, the All-Army championship, and the Service championship in 1956, before qualifying for the Olympic team.  At the Olympics he captured a gold medal in the heavyweight division and served as the U.S. flag bearer at the closing ceremony.

1956 Olympic results
 Round of 16: bye
 Quarterfinal: Defeated Josef Němec KO 2
 Semifinal: Defeated Daan Bekker (South Africa) KO 3
 Final: Defeated Lev Mukhin (Soviet Union) KO 1 (won gold medal)

Rademacher also attended college, playing offensive line on the football team for Washington State.

Professional career

After winning the gold medal, Rademacher started saying that he would be able to become world heavyweight champion in his first professional fight. He made his belief public and was able to lure world Heavyweight champion Floyd Patterson into defending his crown against him in his  professional debut. It is the only time to date that a fighter making his professional debut has challenged for the world heavyweight title.

The bout, at Sick's Stadium in Seattle, was refereed by former light-heavyweight champion Tommy Loughran, who himself had contended for the heavy crown once, vs. Primo Carnera, in 1934. Rademacher dropped Patterson in round two, but Patterson recovered and knocked Rademacher down seven times, defeating him by a knockout in round six. Legendary boxing promoter Jack Hurley promoted the match.

Rademacher fought Zora Folley, Brian London, George Chuvalo, Buddy Turman, and the former world light heavyweight champion, Archie Moore. He lost to Moore, Folley and London but beat Chuvalo, LaMar Clark, and Turman, among others. His last bout was with former world middleweight champion Carl "Bobo" Olson, whom he beat by decision.

Personal life
Rademacher had Finnish ancestry; his maternal grandparents were immigrants from Finland. He was married to Margaret and had a daughter Susan (born c. 1954–1955). In addition to boxing, he was a salesman and inventor. He was president of the company Kiefer-McNeil which was founded by fellow Olympian, Adolph Kiefer. Rademacher died in Sandusky, Ohio on June 4, 2020, at the age of 91. His brain was donated for medical research.

Professional boxing record

See also
Rafael Lovera
Joves De La Puz
Joko Arter

References

External links

 
 Alternate record site

1928 births
2020 deaths
Boxers from Washington (state)
Heavyweight boxers
Washington State Cougars football players
American football offensive linemen
People from Yakima County, Washington
Players of American football from Washington (state)
Boxers at the 1956 Summer Olympics
Olympic boxers of the United States
Winners of the United States Championship for amateur boxers
Medalists at the 1956 Summer Olympics
American male boxers
Olympic gold medalists for the United States in boxing
American people of Finnish descent
United States Army soldiers